Princess Hejing of the First Rank (固倫和敬公主; 31 July 1731- 30 Sep 1792), was a princess of the Qing dynasty as the third daughter of the Qianlong Emperor. Her mother was Empress Xiaoxianchun.

Life 
The third princess was born on 31 July 1731, when her mother was still a primary consort, and was raised by Dowager Consort Chunyuqin, a consort of the Kangxi Emperor. She was bestowed the title of "Princess Hejing of the First Rank" (固伦和敬公主; "hejing" meaning "harmonious and respectful"), after the enthronement of the Qianlong Emperor.

In 1746, Ministry of Internal Affairs prepared a dowry worth of 2500 taels, and in April 1747, she married the Mongolian prince Septeng Baljur of the Borjigin clan. Her wedding banquet was held in the Hall of Preserving Harmony in the Forbidden City.

She continued to collect her meals from the palace. This kind of treatment was equal to that of an Imperial Noble Consort, foreshadowing the indulgence later received by her younger half-sisters Princess Hejing and Princess Hexiao.

The princess gave birth to 4 daughters and 1 son, Eleke Temur Babai (personally named by her father). Her first daughter married Yonghuang's son, Miande, while her fourth daughter married Fengshenhulun, a son of Princess Hejia of the Second Rank. After the marriage, the princess continued lavish lifestyle—her annual expenses reached 15.000 taels, while her allowance was 80.000 taels.

In 1772, she was awarded together with her half-sister and Princess Shushen of the Second Rank, sixth daughter of deposed the crown prince, Yunreng.

Septeng Baljur died in 1775, leaving her widowed. Princess Hejing didn't remarry and died on 30 September 1792. Her coffin was interred in a tomb in Chaoyang District, Beijing.

Family
Parents
Father: Aisin-Gioro Hongli (爱新觉罗 弘曆), the Qianlong Emperor (乾隆帝)
Mother: Empress Xiaoxianchun (孝賢純皇后), of the Fuca clan (富察氏) (28 March 1712 – 8 April 1748)
Consort(s) and issue: 
Septeng Baljur (色布腾巴尔珠尔; 28 June 1731 – 15 August 1792), of the Khorchin Borjigin clan (愛新覺羅氏) 
Eleke Temur Babai (鄂勒哲特穆尔额尔克巴拜; 1747 – 1793), 1st son
Lady Borijigin, 1st daughter
Married Miande (綿德), of the Aisin-Gioro clan (爱新觉罗氏), eldest son of Yonghuang, and had no issue.
Lady Borjigin, 2nd daughter
Lady Borjigin, 3rd daughter
Married Prince Aohan of the Fourth Rank (汉固山贝子), a descendant of Princess Aohan, eldest daughter of Hong Taiji.
Lady Borjigin, 4th daughter
Married Fengshenhulun (丰绅济伦), of the Fuca clan (富察氏), eldest son of Princess Hejia of the Second Rank, and had issue (four sons and one daughter).

Ancestry

References 

1731 births
1792 deaths
Qing dynasty princesses
18th-century Chinese women
18th-century Chinese people
Daughters of emperors